Joseph Warren (June 11, 1741 – June 17, 1775), a Founding Father of the United States, was an American physician who was one of the most important figures in the Patriot movement in Boston during the early days of the American Revolution, eventually serving as President of the revolutionary Massachusetts Provincial Congress. Warren enlisted Paul Revere and William Dawes on April 18, 1775, to leave Boston and spread the alarm that the British garrison in Boston was setting out to raid the town of Concord and arrest rebel leaders John Hancock and Samuel Adams. Warren participated in the Battles of Lexington and Concord the following day, the opening engagements of the American Revolutionary War.

Warren had been commissioned a major general in the colony's militia shortly before the June 17, 1775 Battle of Bunker Hill. Rather than exercise his rank, Warren chose to participate in the battle as a private soldier, and was killed in combat when British troops stormed the redoubt atop Breed's Hill. His death, immortalized in John Trumbull's painting, The Death of General Warren at the Battle of Bunker's Hill, June 17, 1775, galvanized the rebel forces. Warren has been memorialized in the naming of many towns, counties, streets, and other locations in the United States, by statues, and in numerous other ways.

Biography

Joseph Warren was born in Roxbury, Province of Massachusetts Bay, to Joseph and Mary (née Stevens) Warren. His father was a respected farmer who died in October 1755 when he fell off a ladder while gathering fruit in his orchard. After attending the Roxbury Latin School, Joseph enrolled in Harvard College, graduating in 1759, and then taught for about a year at Roxbury Latin. He studied medicine and married 18-year-old heiress Elizabeth Hooten on September 6, 1764. She died in 1773, leaving him with four children: Elizabeth, Joseph, Mary, and Richard. Before his death in 1775, he was engaged to Mercy Scollay.

While practicing medicine and surgery in Boston, he became involved in politics, associating with John Hancock, Samuel Adams, and other leaders of the broad movement labeled Sons of Liberty. Warren conducted an autopsy on the body of young Christopher Seider in February 1770, and was a member of the Boston committee that assembled a report on the following month's Boston Massacre. Earlier, in 1768, Royal officials tried to place his publishers Edes and Gill on trial for an incendiary newspaper essay Warren wrote under the pseudonym A True Patriot, but no local jury would indict them.

In 1774, he authored the song "Free America," which was published in colonial newspapers. The poem was set to a traditional British tune, "The British Grenadiers."

Joseph Warren joined the Freemasons, being initiated in the St. Andrew's Lodge, and later became Past Provincial Grand Master of Massachusetts.

Lexington and Concord

As Boston's conflict with the royal government came to a head in 1773–1775, Warren was appointed to the Boston Committee of Correspondence. He twice delivered orations in commemoration of the Massacre, the second time in March 1775 while the town was occupied by army troops. Warren drafted the Suffolk Resolves, which were endorsed by the Continental Congress, to advocate resistance to Parliament's Coercive Acts, which were otherwise known as the Intolerable Acts. He was appointed President of the Massachusetts Provincial Congress, the highest position in the revolutionary government.

In mid-April 1775, Warren and Dr. Benjamin Church were the two top members of the Committee of Correspondence left in Boston. On the afternoon of April 18, the British troops in the town mobilized for a long-planned raid on the nearby town of Concord, and already before nightfall word of mouth had spread knowledge of the mobilization widely within Boston. It had been known to rebel leadership for weeks that General Gage in Boston had plans to destroy munitions stored in Concord by the colonials, and it was also known that they would be taking a route through Lexington. Some unsupported stories argue that Warren received additional information from a highly placed informant (usually claiming it was from Margaret Kemble Gage, the wife of General Thomas Gage) that the troops had orders to arrest Samuel Adams and John Hancock. However, there is little evidence of this as the troops apparently had no such orders. Regardless, Warren learned there was some British expedition likely to begin that night, and so sent William Dawes and Paul Revere on their famous "midnight rides" to warn Hancock and Adams in Lexington. (There is growing consensus in new scholarship that Mrs. Gage never did conspire against the British and that Warren needed no informant to deduce that the British were mobilizing.)

Warren slipped out of Boston early on April 19, and during that day's Battle of Lexington and Concord, he coordinated and led militia into the fight alongside William Heath as the British Army returned to Boston. When the enemy were returning from Concord, he was among the foremost in hanging upon their rear and assailing their flanks. During this fighting Warren was nearly killed, a musket ball striking part of his wig. When his mother saw him after the battle and heard of his escape, she entreated him with tears again not to risk life so precious. "Wherever danger is, dear mother," he answered, "there will your son be. Now is no time for one of America's children to shrink from the most hazardous duty; I will either set my country free, or shed my last drop of blood to make her so." He then turned to recruiting and organizing soldiers for the Siege of Boston, promulgating the Patriots' version of events, and negotiating with Gen. Gage in his role as head of the Provincial Congress.

Death

Warren was commissioned as a major general by the Provincial Congress on June 14, 1775. Several days later, in the moments before the Battle of Bunker Hill, Warren arrived where the militia was forming and asked where the heaviest fighting would be. General Israel Putnam pointed to Breed's Hill. Warren volunteered to join the fighting as a private against the wishes of General Putnam and Colonel William Prescott, both of whom requested that he serve as their commander. Warren declined the command in the belief that Putnam and Prescott were more experienced with war. He was among those inspiring the men to hold rank against superior numbers. Warren was known to have repeatedly declared of the British: "These fellows say we won't fight! By Heaven, I hope I shall die up to my knees in blood!" He fought in the redoubt until out of ammunition and remained until the British made their third and final assault on the hill to give time for the militia to escape. He was killed instantly by a musket or pistol ball in the head by a British officer (possibly Lieutenant Lord Rawdon) who recognized him or by an officer's servant. This account is supported by a 2011 forensic analysis. His body was stripped of clothing, bayoneted until unrecognizable, and then shoved into a shallow ditch.

British Captain Walter Laurie, who had been defeated at Old North Bridge, later said he "stuffed the scoundrel with another rebel into one hole, and there he and his seditious principles may remain." In a letter to John Adams, Benjamin Hichborn describes the damage that British Lieutenant James Drew, of the sloop Scorpion, inflicted on Warren's body two days after the Battle of Bunker Hill: "In a day or two after, Drew went upon the Hill again opened the dirt that was thrown over Doctor Warren, spit in his face jumped on his stomach and at last cut off his head and committed every act of violence upon his body." His body was exhumed ten months after his death by his brothers and Paul Revere, who identified the remains by the artificial tooth he had placed in the jaw. His body was placed in the Granary Burying Ground and later (in 1825) in St. Paul's Church before finally being moved in 1855 to his family's vault in Forest Hills Cemetery.

Legacy

General Gage is rumored to have said that Warren's death was equal to the death of 500 ordinary colonials. It encouraged the revolutionary cause because it was viewed by many Americans as an act of martyrdom.

At the time of Warren's death, his children were staying with his fiancée, Mercy Scollay, in Worcester as refugees from the Siege of Boston. She continued to look after them, gathering support for their education from John Hancock, Samuel Adams, Mercy Otis Warren, Benedict Arnold, and even the Continental Congress. Joseph's youngest brother and apprentice in medicine, John Warren, served as a surgeon during the Battle of Bunker Hill and the rest of the war, and afterwards founded Harvard Medical School and co-founded the Massachusetts Medical Society. 

There are at least four statues of Joseph Warren on public display. Three are in Boston: one in the exhibit lodge adjacent to the Bunker Hill Monument, another on the grounds of the Roxbury Latin School, and the third atop the puddingstone at his grave site at the Forest Hills Cemetery (this statue was commissioned by the 6th Masonic District, and dedicated in a ceremony by the Grand Master of Masons in Massachusetts on October 22, 2016). The fourth is in a small park on the corner of Third and Pennsylvania avenues in Warren, Pennsylvania, a city, borough, and county all named after the general.

Fort Warren on George's Island in Boston harbor, started in 1833, was named in his honor. In 1840, the first Warren School was built on Salem Street in Charlestown, Massachusetts near Bunker Hill. It relocated to School and Summer Streets in 1868, and later merged with the Prescott School to form the Warren-Prescott School.

Fourteen states have a Warren County named after him. Additionally, Warren, Pennsylvania; Warren, Michigan; Warren, New Jersey; Warrenton, Missouri; Warrenton, Virginia; Warren, Maine; Warren, Massachusetts; Warrenton, North Carolina; Warren, Connecticut and 30 Warren Townships are also named in his honor.

The New York county of Warren is named after him, but the town of Warrensburg within that county is not; the town is in fact named after James Warren, a prominent early settler.

The streets of Detroit, Michigan, were redesigned after the 1806 fire, based on the Pierre L'Enfant Plan for Washington, D.C.; Warren Avenue in Detroit is named after Joseph Warren.

Five ships in the Continental Navy and United States Navy were named Warren in his honor.

Warren Square in Savannah, Georgia, is also named for him.

Freemasonry
Warren was a Scottish Freemason. He was a member of Lodge St Andrews, No.81, (Boston, Massachusetts) which held a Charter from the Grand Lodge of Scotland. The Lodge continues to meet in Boston under the Grand Lodge of Massachusetts. The date he joined the Lodge is not known but was during the period after the inauguration of the Lodge on St Andrew's Day, 30 November 1756 and 15 May 1769 when he is recorded in the Grand Lodge of Scotland's membership register as being the Master of the Lodge. Paul Revere and William Palfrey are also recorded, in the same entry, with Revere being named as Secretary of the Lodge. Warren was appointed Grand Master of all Scottish Freemasonry in the 13 colonies by the Grand Lodge of Scotland.

He was appointed Grand Master of the newly established Provincial Grand Lodge of Massachusetts in that same year. (Upon his death, Joseph Webb became Acting Grand Master.)

The Grand Lodge of Massachusetts has an award in his name for Masons who have served the fraternity, the country, or humanity with distinction. It is the second-highest honor conferred by the Grand Lodge, only surpassed by the Henry Price medal. The Henry Price medal is usually awarded to those who served with distinction in the Grand Lodge, while the Joseph Warren medal may be conferred upon any Mason within the Grand jurisdiction.

In popular culture
Walter Coy portrayed Dr. Warren in the 1957 film Johnny Tremain. Warren also appeared in episodes 5 and 9 of the 2002 animated television show Liberty's Kids.

Ryan Eggold was cast as Warren in the 2015 miniseries Sons of Liberty.

Dr. Warren is featured in the song "Wildfire" by the band Mandolin Orange on their 2016 album Blindfaller.

Joseph Warren is referenced in the A. W. Burns/George W. Hewitt song "America Shall Aye Be Free".

See also

 Patriot (American Revolution)
 List of Freemasons
 Boston Tea Party

Footnotes

Bibliography

Further reading
 Forgotten Patriot Leader of the American Revolution Who Was Killed in Battle Profile of Joseph Warren's life and death.
 The Other Ride of Paul Revere: The Brokerage Role in the Making of the American Revolution Social Network Analysis using only organizational affiliations identifying Joseph Warren and Paul Revere as central to the events leading up to the American Revolution.
 The Sword of Joseph Warren Proceedings of the Massachusetts Historical Society with a first-hand account of Joseph Warren's death at the Battle of Bunker Hill.

External links

 Dr. Joseph Warren Foundation Devoted to the life and legacy of America's "Founding Martyr".
 Dr. Joseph Warren on the Web Compendium of full texts of Joseph Warren's writings and speeches, including weekly updates.
 National Park Service: Dr. Joseph Warren Profile of the hero of the Battle of Bunker Hill.
 Joseph Warren Dies a Martyr in the Battle of Bunker Hill New England Historical Society account on the death of Joseph Warren.
 Painting: Joseph Warren Description of the portrait of Joseph Warren by John Singleton Copley on display at Boston's Museum of Fine Arts.
 The Warren Tavern: History

1741 births
1775 deaths
People from colonial Boston
People of colonial Massachusetts
18th-century American physicians
American Freemasons
United States military personnel killed in the American Revolutionary War
Political leaders of the American Revolution
Harvard College alumni
Massachusetts militiamen in the American Revolution
Militia generals in the American Revolution
Continental Army officers from Massachusetts
Physicians in the American Revolution
Physicians from Massachusetts
Burials in Boston
Deaths by firearm in Massachusetts
Roxbury Latin School alumni
People from Roxbury, Boston
Founding Fathers of the United States